The Afghan records in swimming are the fastest ever performances of swimmers from Afghanistan, which are recognised and ratified by the Afghanistan National Swimming Federation.

All records were set in finals unless noted otherwise.

Long Course (50 m)

Men

Short Course (25 m)

Men

References

Afghanistan
Swimming
records
Swimming